The Walmart Arkansas Music Pavilion (originally known as the Arkansas Music Pavilion and commonly known as the Walmart AMP) is an outdoor amphitheater located in Rogers, Arkansas. The venue opened in June 2005 as a semi-permanent venue, becoming a permanent venue in 2014. Its capacity is now 9,500 fans.

It opened June 7, 2014, with a performance by Blake Shelton and Hunter Hayes.

History
The Arkansas Music Pavilion was created in 2005 as a concept inspired by some of the most well known amphitheater's in the country including the Cape Cod Melody Tent (MA), The Universal Lending Pavilion (CO) and the Aspen Music Tent(CO) and The Boston Harbor Lights Pavilion (MA). These concepts generally combined a covered seating area and lawn seating. The original concept for a seasonal, semi-permanent concert venue was created by Dan White, Amy Mack White and Kelly Rourke which combined the features of an architecturally interesting canopy, theater style box seating, and no seat that was farther than 120 feet from the stage. The venue structure was designed by Tentnolology from Vancouver, Canada. The original venue had 2,533 seats under the pavilion. The entry into the market was discussed with the Walton Arts Center and was designed to become "collaborative and never competitive" with the Walton Arts Center. It was thought that the two venues together could create a year-round arts infrastructure for the region. 

The AMP was unanimously approved by The City of Fayetteville under Mayor Dan Coody and was embraced by The Fayetteville Economic Development Council as a driver of tourism and arts development for the region. It opened to the public on Father's Day weekend in 2005 with headliners America and The Doobie Brothers. The original venue was located on the bluff behind the Northwest Arkansas Mall overlooking the city of Fayetteville. The land lease was set at $1 with Alice Church, manager of the mall who believed the concept would drive economic impact to the mall and the region. The venue operated at this location for four seasons from 2005 to 2009, with the original ownership team consisting of Dan & Amy White, Kelly Rourke, Joseph Boskus and Robbie Bader. Each season had 10 headlining national tours. The venue was independently owned and operated. The "AMP" became one of the fastest growing music venues in the country and renowned national tour stop between Kansas City and Dallas. In its second season it became the largest outdoor venue in the State of Arkansas. The venue played host to several community fundraising events including a respite shelter for Hurricane Katina, integral in the Bikes Blues and BBQ Festival and the backdrop for the reality TV show "Daly Days" on The Golf Channel. 

In 2009, the venue was sold to Suzie Stephens and Brian Crowne by remaining partners Joseph Boskus, Dan White and Amy White. Brian Crowne had been involved from the inception as a fellow venue owner of George's Majestic Lounge, who acted as a credible advisor to the region's music scene. The original owners stayed on in a consulting capacity for the first year. In 2011, the music venue was purchased by the Walton Arts Center. Failed contract negotiations lead to moving the structure to the Washington County Fairgrounds for 2012 and 2013 seasons. The move saw a dramatic increase in ticket sales and overall turnout for events. 
In January 2013, the Walton Arts Center Council announced plans build a permanent structure for the amphitheater. This location was one of the original locations that the original creators had discussions with as a visible symbol or arts and entertainment for the region. Wanting to remain in Northwest Arkansas, many locations were viewed however the decision was made to build in Rogers near the Pinnacle Hills Promenade. Construction began in late October 2013, with plans to complete in June 2014. In early 2014, Walmart, Inc purchased naming rights to the venue.

Performers

2005

America
The Doobie Brothers
Third Day
38 Special
Patty Loveless
Lee Ann Womack
Robert Earl Keen

2006

The All-American Rejects
Rick Springfield
Gin Blossoms
Doug Stone
Loverboy
Saving Jane
SHeDAISY
Lyle Lovett
The Beach Boys

2007

REO Speedwagon
Earth, Wind & Fire
k.d. lang
Collective Soul
Air Supply

2008

OneRepublic
KC and the Sunshine Band
Cross Canadian Ragweed
Ween
Pat Benatar
The Black Crowes
G. Love & Special Sauce
Eddie Money
Jason Aldean
Ani DiFranco
Gary Allan

2009

The Marshall Tucker Band
Molly Hatchet
Collin Raye
Ghostland Observatory
Peter Frampton
LeAnn Rimes
Ben Folds
Queensrÿche
Darius Rucker
Cake
Cross Canadian Ragweed

2010

Levon Helm
Blue Öyster Cult
Indigo Girls
Goo Goo Dolls
Ted Nugent
Gary Allan
Eli Young Band
Colbie Caillat
STS9
Cross Canadian Ragweed
Luke Bryan
Bret Michaels
Pat Travers & Rick Derringer
The Black Crowes

2011

Pretty Lights
Lucinda Williams
The Band Perry
Primus
David Crowder Band
Rodney Carrington
The B-52's
Rick Springfield
Charlie Daniels Band
Candlebox
Jamey Johnson
Needtobreathe

2012

Big Gigantic
Hank Williams Jr.
Cake
Jamey Johnson
Five Finger Death Punch
Wilco
Luke Bryan
Ted Nugent
Colbie Caillat & Gavin DeGraw
Daughtry
Candlebox
Miranda Lambert
Brantley Gilbert
The Avett Brothers

2013

Little Big Town
Old Crow Medicine Show
Gary Allan
Summerland Tour
Easton Corbin
Three Days Grace
Alabama Shakes
The Black Crowes
Lynyrd Skynyrd
Vampire Weekend
ZZ Top

2014

Blake Shelton
Darius Rucker
Dierks Bentley
Willie Nelson
Miranda Lambert
Steely Dan
Pepe Aguilar
Steve Martin
Tim McGraw
Boston
Cheech & Chong
Foreigner
Jake Owen
The Avett Brothers
Santana
Foster The People

2015

Jackson Browne
TobyMac
Kid Rock
Bryan Adams
Hozier
Pedro Fernández
Hank Williams Jr.
Whitesnake
Fifth Harmony
Kenny Chesney
Widespread Panic
Colbie Caillat
Lady Antebellum
Third Eye Blind & Dashboard Confessional
Steve Miller Band
Dave Matthews Band
Chicago
Needtobreathe
Brantley Gilbert

2016

Twenty One Pilots
Journey
Kenny Chesney
Miranda Lambert
Jason Aldean
Korn
Darius Rucker
Rachel Platten
Ellie Goulding
Widespread Panic
Chris Stapleton
Meghan Trainor
Kevin Hart
Weezer & Panic! At the Disco

2017

Blink-182
Boston
Bush
Travis Scott
Kidz Bop
Train
Mary J. Blige
ZZ Top
Elle King
Third Eye Blind
Hank Williams Jr.
Steve Miller Band & Peter Frampton
Rascal Flats
Tedeschi Trucks Band
Straight No Chaser & Postmodern Jukebox
Lady Antebellum
Brad Paisley
Matchbox Twenty & the Counting Crows
Zac Brown Band
Sublime with Rome & The Offspring
Kiss

2018

Janet Jackson
Macklemore & Kesha
Thirty Seconds to Mars
Halsey
Chris Stapleton
Pentatonix
Niall Horan
5 Seconds of Summer
Slayer
Alan Jackson
Ringo Starr & His All-Starr Band
Needtobreathe
Lynyrd Skynyrd
Odesza
Brantley Gilbert
Primus & Mastodon
Dave Matthews Band
Jim Gaffigan
Ray LaMontagne
Chris Stapleton
Chicago & REO Speedwagon
Kenny Chesney
Modest Mouse
Weezer & Pixies
G-Eazy 
Coheed and Cambria & Taking Back Sunday
Keith Urban
Charlie Puth

2019

Chris Tomlin
Santana
Leon Bridges
The Killers
Earth, Wind & Fire
The Avett Brothers
Florida Georgia Line
Steve Miller Band with Marty Stuart and His Fabulous Superlatives
Trevor Noah
Train & Goo Goo Dolls
Brad Paisley
Young the Giant & Fitz and the Tantrums
Alabama
Hootie and The Blowfish
Chris Young
Yes, ASIA, John Lodge of The Moody Blues, Carl Palmer's ELP Legacy
Third Eye Blind & Jimmy Eat World
Why Don't We
Sublime with Rome and Michael Franti
Alan Jackson
+LIVE+ & Bush
Thomas Rhett
Nelly, TLC & Flo-Rida
The Smashing Pumpkins and Noel Gallagher's High Flying Birds
Sheryl Crow and Jason Isbell & The 400 Unit
Rascal Flatts
Breaking Benjamin with Chevelle, Three Days Grace
Maze featuring Frankie Beverly with Lalah Hathaway and Johnny Gill
Luke Combs

2021
Phish

2022
for KING & COUNTRY
Backstreet Boys
Goo Goo Dolls with Blue October
Chicago with Brian Wilson
An Evening with James Taylor & his All Star Band. 
OneRepublic with Needtobreathe

References

External links
 Walton Arts Center Official Website

Buildings and structures in Rogers, Arkansas
Tourist attractions in Benton County, Arkansas
Music venues in Arkansas